Choe Chang-ik (1896 – 1960) was a Korean politician in the Japanese colonial era. He was a member of the Korean independence movement. He was also known by the names Choe Chang-sok (최창석, 崔昌錫), Choe Chang-sun (최창순, 崔昌淳), Choe Tong-u (최동우, 崔東宇), and Ri Kon-u.

Early life
Choe Chang-ik was born in Onsong County, Korea Empire in 1896. His exact date of birth remains unknown.

In his fifth year of high school he participated in the March 1st Movement, which resulted in his expulsion. That same year he went to Japan to continue his education at the Seisoku English School (today's Seisoku Gakuen High School).

Choe Chang-ik later studied at Tokyo's Waseda University in the  Department of Economics and Politics where he organised a student union and continued his activism. This included secretly infiltrating areas in Korea such as Ganggyeong, Jeonju, Okgu, and Gunsan, where he went on a lecture tour to share his ideas on socialism and equality. Choe Chang-ik was arrested by the Japanese police for these activities but was eventually released. He graduated from Waseda University in February 1925.

Timeline
In June 1923, Choe Chang-ik returned to Korea and became a member of the Korean Labor Society. In July of that year he helped found the Korea Communist Youth Alliance and served as a commissioner. By September he was arrested by the police while leading a Korean Labor Conference meeting. In April 1924, Choe took part in the founding of the Joseon Youth Alliance and was elected to the group's central executive committee. Eight months later he helped found the Socialist Alliance (an organization not affiliated with the Seoul Youth Association) and was elected to serve as a member of its executive committee.

Following his graduation Choe traveled to the Communist International World Congress as a representative of the Seoul Youth Association. During his return home he became involved with Kim Chwa-chin's Shinmin group, a rebel community in Shinmin province, Manchuria. Choe eventually worked to create a communist league within the organisation.

Choe eventually seceded from Kim's group in October 1925 and returned to Korea. In the same month Japanese officials arrested him for his involvement with the Shinmin group along with Han Bin (한빈, 韓斌), Lee Kyung-ho (이경호, 李京鎬) and Lee Young (이영, 李英). In 1926, Choe and Park Du-hui, a member of the Shinmin group, were selected to attend a communist conference in Vladivostok of Russian far east. While there he joined efforts to start a national party assembly. In 1927, upon returning to Korea, he joined, and became an executive, of the Communist Party of Korea. In February 1928 Choe was imprisoned for the so-called "Third Communist Party of Korea Incident". He escaped from prison in 1935.

In 1936, he sought and gained political asylum in China. There he became a part of the Korean National Revolutionary Party and formed the Chonwi Club (전위동맹) in Hankou. He married his wife, Heo Jong-suk, in 1937. In May 1938, he became the commander of Choson uiyongdae (조선의용대), which was Kim Won-bong's Korean National Revolutionary Party's Military Organisation, but he complained that it was funded by Chiang Kai-shek's Kuomintang. A disagreement followed and he left Kim Won-bong's (김원봉, 金元鳳) organisation. He also went to Yan'an, in partnership with Mu Chong (무정, 武亭) and Kim Tu-bong (김두봉, 金枓奉).

In January 1941, with funding from the Communist Party of China, and later with Lee Gunwu, Mu Chong founded the "Hebei Korea Youth Federation" in Jindong. In 1942, with Kim Dubong and Lee Gunwu, Mujung, Han bin was created as a Chosun independent alliance, and he was elected as the vice-chairman of the independent alliance. In September 1945, he was appointed to the Communist Party of Korea's Political Committee, and in December he returned to Pyongyang with Kim Tu-bong and Mu Chong. In March 1946, he founded the New Korean Democratic Party and was elected vice-chairman. In August of that year he was involved in the integration of the New Democratic Party and the Communist Party of Korea to North faction of Workers' Party of Korea. In September the Workers' Party of North Korea's Central Committee, the Standing Committee, elected Choe as commerce and business commissar.

Ambassador Ianov and Choe Chang-ik discussed the visit of the DPRK government delegation to Eastern Europe and the USSR (east bloc), and the policies of the Korean Workers' Party. In 1948 he attended the Workers' Party of North Korea's Central Committee and the deputies of the North Korean Supreme People's Assembly. In September Choe became the first North Korea minister of finance; in 1952 deputy prime minister; in 1954 minister of finance and in 1955 security minister of the DPRK.

See also 
 Kim Won-bong
 Pak Hon-yong
 Kim Tu-bong
 Ho Jong-suk
August Faction Incident

References

External links
 Choe Chang-ik 
 Choe Chang-ik: Korean historic person information  
 Choe Chang-ik 

1896 births
1957 deaths
People from Onsong County
Finance ministers of North Korea
Korean independence activists
Executed communists
Executed politicians
Executed revolutionaries
Executed North Korean people
Korean revolutionaries
Communist Party of Korea politicians
Korean expatriates in China
Korean expatriates in the Soviet Union
Waseda University alumni
Kim Won-bong
Members of the 1st Central Committee of the Workers' Party of North Korea
Members of the 2nd Central Committee of the Workers' Party of Korea
Members of the 1st Political Committee of the Workers' Party of North Korea
Members of the 1st Standing Committee of the Workers' Party of North Korea
Members of the 2nd Political Committee of the Workers' Party of Korea
Members of the 2nd Standing Committee of the Workers' Party of Korea
Members of the 1st Supreme People's Assembly